The Chinese Ambassador to Mexico is the official representative of the People's Republic of China to Mexico.

List of representatives

See also
China–Mexico relations

References 

Ambassadors of China to Mexico
Mexico
China